The Waipawa River is a braided river of southern Hawke's Bay, in New Zealand's eastern North Island. It flows from the slopes of  Te Atuaoparapara (once known as 'Sixty-six') in the Ruahine Range southeast past the town of Waipawa before joining the Tukituki River. The river rises at the  Waipawa Saddle, which is also the source of the Waikamaka River. West of Waipawa, near Ruataniwha, the Mangaonuku Stream is a tributary on the northern bank. The Waipawa's flow is generally greater than that of the Tukituki River, into which it flows.

The Old Bed of Waipawa River flows roughly parallel with and north of the present Waipawa River to join the Tukituki through the Papanui Stream, south west of Lake Poukawa. The Waipawa changed its course during a flood in 1868. It reverted to its old course during Cyclone Gabrielle in February 2023, until the Coronation Park stop bank in Waipawa was repaired on 16 February, returning the Waipawa to its post 1868 course.

River quality is sampled at the SH50 bridge. At that site its Macroinvertebrate Community Index is C (of grades A to D) and likely degrading, but it is in the best 25% of rivers for most samples, except clarity. In warm weather cyanobacteria sometimes develop. Other main routes crossing the river are SH2 and the Palmerston North–Gisborne railway at Waipawa.

There are hundreds of banded dotterel (pohowera) and pied stilt around the river.

Waipawa Forks Hut provides accommodation close to the headwaters of the river. On the ridge to the north, above the headwaters, is Sunrise Hut. It is the most popular hut in the Ruahine Park and was renovated in 2020. A day walk is possible, via Sunrise and the Saddle.

References

External links 

 1910 photo of bridge at Waipawa
 1911 photo of railway bridge

Rivers of the Hawke's Bay Region
Rivers of New Zealand